Non-white women experienced repression under apartheid in South Africa in a distinct way.  They experienced oppression, while white women were favoured in society. Black women held the lowest position in the social hierarchy with Indian and non-black coloured women faring slightly better. White women, being the most favoured. Apartheid defined all black citizens as secondary to white citizens, however, black women were assigned an even lower status through both laws and social norms. This has been coined the “triple oppression” of race, class, and gender. Women had authority in pre-colonial Africa as they were the main agricultural producers. When farming declined, however, women lost their authority and status, meaning they were left with no real place or role in society. The traditions of communities within South Africa were the basis of the gender discrimination present under apartheid. Under traditional law, women were denied the right to own land, the right to custody of their children, and the right to be chief or elected as chief. This reinforced apartheid ideology as well as the legacies of colonialism which classified women as second-class citizens.

History

Discrimination 
Non-discrimination was a key aspect of South Africa's first democratically elected government in 1994, which officially adopted a “gender-equality” stance on decreasing discrimination. South Africa has signed the Convention on the Elimination of All Forms of Discrimination against Women (CEDAW) as agreed to the Beijing Platform of Action during the World Conference on Women in Beijing in 1995 to take steps to eliminate gender discrimination. Section 9(3) of the constitution states “The state may not  discriminate against anyone using any of the following; race, gender, sex, pregnancy, marital status, ethnic group, social class, skin colour, sexual orientation, age, disability, religious belief, culture, tribe etc”. The inclusion of both sex and gender as grounds for proscribing discrimination is particularly significant as it protects individuals from discrimination based on biology or physical traits as well as social or cultural background of the perceived role and position of women in the society.

“Freedom cannot be achieved unless women have been emancipated from all forms of oppression... Our endeavors must be about the liberation of the woman, the emancipation of the man and the liberty of the child.”8 Dec 2013 – Nelson Mandela.

Gender discrimination was prevalent within written law, as the access women had to properties was dependent on their relationship with men.  Due to restrictive laws in the 1930s, black women were forced to use identity cards, regarded as passbooks, in order to move around the country, which limited their movement into cities and towns. Lots of women were unable to find jobs in urban areas, limiting them to brewing beer, being nannies, and doing casual work in farms owned by whites. It has been widely argued that traditional rulers suppress the acceptance of gender equality in the society, for the patriarchal power structures, and this has predominantly affected black women, as the power structure prohibited them from owning property thereby reducing their role to mere mothers and housewives.

Employment discrimination is still dominant in South Africa as many women find themselves either excluded from the job market or restricted to the lowest paying jobs. Fifty-seven percent of all employed South African women work as domestic servants or agricultural laborers. These positions that often have little or no power in negotiating working conditions and wages. Apartheid denied African women the right to travel freely to seek gainful employment, which indirectly locked them in poverty without an escape route. Employers often take advantage of women by paying them lesser wages than their men counterparts thereby violating the legal act put in place to protect worker rights.

Key laws and acts relating to gender discrimination. 
In the post-apartheid era of South Africa, multiple laws and acts were put in place with the aim of reducing gender discrimination. These include

1. The Commission of Gender Equality – monitors issues of gender in civil society. The functions are set out clearly in Section 187, which provides that: “The evolving constitutional jurisprudence emanating from the Constitutional Court suggests a clear break from South Africa's ignominious legal past to one forged on principles of equality and non-discrimination”.

2. The Office on the Status of Women - Responsible for mainstreaming gender in government departments.

3. The Women's Budget Initiative (WBI) – examines the implications of the national budget on women.

4. The Labour Act of 1995 - includes a Code of Good Conduct that compels workplaces to have formal sexual harassment policies in place.

5. The Basic Conditions of Employment Act - ensures that there is a minimum requirement for maternity leave which includes ante-natal, post-natal and family responsibility leave.

6. The Employment Equity Act ensures women's equal access to the workplace.

7. The Skills Development Act ensures that women receive education and training to gain the necessary skills.

8. The Basic Child Support Grant - gives financial support to children up to the age of 14.

9. The Maintenance Act of 1998 - compels both partners to financially support their children. It also allows employers to deduct money from a parent's salary or wages to contribute financially to the support of the child/children.

10. The Domestic Violence Act (DVA) of 1998 – defends women's rights to bodily integrity and freedom from violence.

11. The Public Protector, the Human Rights Commission, the Commission for Gender Equality (CGE) and the Electoral Commission, what is commonly known as ‘gender machinery’ - put in place to instil the Bill of Rights.

12. The Constitutional Court, the Equality Court, the Commission for Conciliation, Mediation and Arbitration (CCMA), special Family Courts and labour courts were put in place to allow women to seek legal assistance if their rights were violated.

13. The Recognition of Customary Marriages Act 1998 - prevents the continuing disadvantage that women in customary unions encounter.

14. White women were given the right to vote in 1930.

The Bill of Rights 
It was not until the introduction of the Constitution of South Africa in 1996 that all women in South Africa were formally recognised as equal citizens. In this Constitution, there was a special paragraph for women, titled ‘Equality’. In this Bill of Rights, sections 9, 10, 11, 12 specifically refer to women as equals and the basis of how to be treated. Section 9 (3) prohibits any form of discrimination with relation to gender, sexual orientation, marital status, pregnancy, ethnicity or culture. This is followed by sections 10 and 11 which give the right to be treated equally and the right to life. One of the most significant sections is 12, which states the right "to be free from all forms of violence from either public or private sources." As domestic violence has been an issue for all women, this establishes that within the domain of a home or family they are under public policy as well.

Education, marriage, consent, prostitution and the HIV epidemic amongst black women 

Research done by the Gender Advocacy Programme (GAP) found out that “Black women generally tend to have fewer opportunities for education, employment, economic and political participation, etc.” This is further exacerbated when looking at apartheid's effects on black women's social standings in South Africa. It caused separate development and the differences caused by the migrant labour guidelines damaged the social makeup of South African families.

Education, unemployment and poverty 

Education of girls in South Africa, especially those from poorer townships, is the first step in trying to give them a sense of agency and remove themselves from the vicious cycle of poverty and unemployment. This comes with issues of its own, as women and especially girls, are seen as second class citizens and so are taken advantage of even in places where they should feel safe, such as school. “The Study of Violence Against Children” and articles written by the UN describe the nature and extent of the violence in and around schools. It looked mainly at bullying, corporal punishment, and gender violence in schools and the community which has shown ways in which schools foster gender and sexual violence as well as corporal punishment. Due to these issues, trying to keep girls’ attendance in school is difficult. One-third of rapes were perpetrated by schoolteachers which creates a difficult process for these girls to make reports and claims to the Police. Schools in rural areas are at distance to each other which directly exposes girls to high-risk situations when travelling to school. Less number of female to male attendance in education which cn be directly links to the cycle of unemployment and poverty which can lead to further unwanted situations for women. In recent legislative efforts measures has been put in place to try and improve the number of girls in education by trying to break the cycle. In 2003, the South African Minister of Education set up the Girls’ Education Movement (GEM). GEM is an African movement, supported by UNICEF, where children and young people in schools and communities in South Africa work to bring positive changes in the lives of African girls and boys. GEM aims to:

 Give girls equal access to education
 Improve the quality of education, especially in disadvantaged schools
 Make the school program and school books gender-responsive
 Create schools that are safe and secure for children, especially girls
 Work with boys as strategic partners
 Decrease to gender-based violence
 Abolish harmful cultural practices such as early marriage.

HIV epidemic, prostitution and sexual assault 

In South Africa, it is estimated that 5.5 million are infected with HIV, and over 50% of those infected become infected before the age of 25. One of the main drivers for such large numbers is poverty and unemployment. Poverty underpins women's variability to HIV/Aids because, for women in South Africa, poverty leads them to engaging in prostitution for shelter, food, or other necessities for survival. Many women believe that prostitution is the only way for survival, and they are very unlikely to ask for sexual protection to be used which increases the possibility of contracting HIV. Women are often infected more than men due to rape and sexual assault which then stops many of them from continuing their education. This act deepens the poverty level among South African women. In 2017, 26% of women were estimated to be living with HIV, compared to around 15% of men.

Marriage and consent 

Many marriages within South Africa are pre-arranged by parents for reasons including social standings within a community. A Lobolo, which is a bride price where the groom's parents provides a sum of money as demanded by tradition. The practice could causes major problems because “large numbers of men who pay Lobolo believe they bought the woman outright and she is now his property”. This is why women believe they are owned by their husbands so there is a possibility their consent will not be considered. In any matter, it was estimated that around one- third of women had experienced intimate partner violence in the past 12 months. A level that is similar across all age groups. Many brides in arranged marriages are underage, usually due to the bride's family being poor and needing money to survive.

During the wars 
The Boer Wars were two wars fought during 1880–1881 and 1899–1902 by the British Empire against two independent Boer republics, the Orange Free State and the Transvaal Republic. (‘Boer’ is the Dutch and Afrikaans word for farmer.)

Boer women, children and men that were not fit enough to work for the British were put together in concentration camps during the Boer War 2. The first two of these camps were established to house the families of cities who had surrendered voluntarily. But very soon, families that were a burden for the British were driven forcibly into camps that were established all over the country. The camps first were refugee camps but they later became concentration camps. The horrible conditions in these camps caused the death of 4,177 women, 22,074 children under sixteen and 1,676 men, mainly those too old to be on commando. The white and the black people were put in different camps.

There were 14,154 deaths officially recorded in the black section of these camps. It is estimated that 25,000 to 34,000 deaths occurred in the Boer camps, with 81% being death of children. These statistics, however, do not include the number of deaths which happened en route to the camps and during capture. The initial investigation of these camps started because of the white child mortality.

The role of children was very important during this war and the race and class affected the experience of each child. Children were often separated from their families and exposed to harsh conditions and diseases. Their health going into the camps was already deteriorating and significantly declined upon arrival. The conditions were inhumane and families and children were crammed together. Such trauma also involved the separation with parents and who did not recognise the faces of their children when they returned home. Black children also were forced to work in Boer camps. Children did earn a little money for work as it was considered contribution to their families. In Bloemfontein, the National Women's Monument was built in memorial of the conflict and dedicated to the women and children.

All women and children were put in concentration camps right away and they were treated very badly. The white camps were much better than the black camps. Field-Marshal Lord Roberts had another motive to put Blacks into camps. Namely to make them work, either to grow crops for the troops or to dig trenches, be wagon drivers or work as miners. They did not receive food, hardly any medical support or shelter and were expected to grow their own crops. The strong-bodied who could work, could exchange labour for food or buy a meal for a cheap price.

On January 22, 1901, the Boschhoek concentration camp for Blacks had about 1,700 interned individuals hold a protest meeting. They state that when they were brought into the camps, they had been promised that they will be paid for all their stock taken by the British. They are also unhappy because "... they receive no food while the Boers who are the cause of the war are fed for free in the refugee camps…” While the war lasted, more and more concentration camps were set up for women and children, and more and more deaths were recorded.

Key movements and groups set up to help women

Federation of South African Women

The Federation of South African Women was a political activist group formed in 1954. Women who protested Apartheid joined the Congress Alliance, a political coalition which fought institutional racial segregation that existed in South Africa and Southwest Africa from 1948-1990s. The FEDSAW's first conference was in 1954, which 150 people attended to establish the core aims of the organisation. The main issue was to fight back against the pass laws which controlled the rights of black people. The introduction of these identity documents meant they had to be always carried. These documents made it harder for people to migrate or find employment. Women were completely under the control of their husbands which meant they could not own any property without the permission of a male.  The ANC Women's League, the Communist Party, and Trade Unions were present at the conference because they believed that the organisation was essential for establishing equality for women in South Africa.  Having these organisations present at the conference gave women the courage to make a dramatic change as it was clear they had support from other organisations. At the conference women discussed what they thought would be essential to improve their standard of life. They drafted a document called ‘What Women Demand’ to the convenors of the Congress of the People to incorporate in the Freedom Charter which outlined the rights and equal opportunities they demanded. Issues discussed in the document were the demand for improved health care, education, and equal pay/rights. “The right to live where we choose”. This statement from the document clearly highlights that woman wanted the option to move freely without the need of the identity card or approval from their husband. Women felt it was crucial to mention as many basic needs as possible in the document to clearly show exactly what they had been deprived of. The Federation of South African Women joined with the same beliefs, common interests, and a strong political attitude in a bid to make genuine change and stop (apartheid) the minority of white settlers making economic and political decisions for South African women.
Women's March

Women's March

The Women's March 1956 organised by FEDSAW was one of the first public protests fighting against apartheid and the abolishment of the Pass Laws. 20,000 women marched to the Union Buildings in Pretoria, to protest legislation aimed at tightening the apartheid government's control over the movement of black women in urban areas and increased violence against women.  Women throughout the country marched and protested for equal pay, rights, education, and equal opportunities they had been deprived of from the government. They were frustrated that their freedom was restricted by identity cards. The movement saw one of the largest crowds ever to gather at the Union building; many women brought their babies on their backs to the march.  This shows the determination these women had by proving to the government that they could carry out their motherly duties as well as demanding equality and freedom at the same time.  The stereotypical assumptions of women's lack of political knowledge and capabilities were proved wrong as the women that took part in the march showed the authorities that they were capable of staging a movement of great proportion. The march was clearly a huge success as it influenced many women to get involved to make a difference. South African women were applauded for their bravery as they risked arrests and detention for taking part in the movement. This shows fearlessness of the women as they were not prepared to give up. At the march women sang a song called ‘Wathint Abafaz, Wathint Imbokodo’- you strike a woman, you strike a rock.  This is significant as it brought together numerous backgrounds and cultures living in South Africa; Indians, Black people, White people. This song highlights the pride these women had in abolishing the abusive laws against them and fighting for equality and a better standard of living.
National Women's Monument

National Women’s Monument

A monument was placed at the Union Buildings in Pretoria, to celebrate the 20,000 brave women that took part in the march which is now celebrated as ‘National Women’s Day’. August 9 is a significant day as it shows the incredible courage the women had when protesting against pass laws, racial segregation and inequality that excised in South Africa. The monument is a legacy of the bravery these women had and is recognised by many worldwide.

What has been done for the women in South Africa 
Many things have been done for women in South Africa. For example, the commemoration of the Women's March is held every year. Even South Africa's political changes and laws, such  as the Bill of Rights, have made great impact on the women in South Africa.

Though many things have been done for the women in South Africa, they are still seen as inferior than men, and are also treated differently from white women. Even as this has not improved, these things have had a positive effect on how women are treated around that area. In this way think about how little girls can now have an education without having to be afraid of going to school.

But not only the direct causes, also think about projects in which things against AIDS are done. By helping to do things against this disease, organisations are making sure that the children – girls and boys – get a chance to  try to live a normal life. Sadly, many young South African citizens are born with HIV/AIDS. There are many organisations that work on women's issues. During the negotiations, an organisation called the Women's National Coalition worked very hard throughout the country, collecting women's views on the country they would like to see. This culminated in women from different political parties becoming part of the political negotiations in South Africa. It also led to the development of the National Gender Policy Framework and the establishment of the (initially) Office of the Status of Women, now the Women's Ministry and the Commission for Gender Equality. The big organisation that was formed in 2006 to accommodate women from all political organs and walks of life is the Progressive Women's Movement of South Africa (PWMSA).

One of the small organisations is Woman's Net, a feminist organisation that especially tries to fight for the equality of women in South Africa. Women also organise themselves in political parties, business organisations, academic institutions, trade union and other structures. Another huge issue in South Africa is the trafficking of women and pseudo-cultural practices that allow child marriages. These arranged marriages have destroyed the lives of many girls. This has changed in 2016 with the amendment of the trafficking legislation to include criminalisation of the "ukuthwala" practice which had been bastardised over time. There are many pieces of legislation that have been introduced to promote the protection of women in the rural settings and those married through traditional customs; to protect women from domestic violence, to protect women from rape and ensure their rights in political, social and economic settings. The challenges remain the publicisation of these and the education of all the citizens about the constitution and the progressive legislation.

Current events 
There continue to be many efforts made for women to gain more rights and fighting against the violence that persists in society.

In September 2019, women took to the streets for three days fighting against the national crisis of violence against women and children. Although President Cyril Ramaphosa assured the women that the laws would be reviewed, they were not satisfied. Some women have asked for the death penalty to be established for those who violate women and children. The fight continues to persist in South African society as women continue to be mistreated and violated.

See also 
LGBT Rights in South Africa
Apartheid
Human Rights in South Africa
Feminism in South Africa

References

External links 
Women's Rights, South African History Online
Black Concentration Camps during the Anglo-Boer War 2, 1900-1902, South African History Online
History of Women's struggle in South Africa, South African History Online

Women's rights in South Africa
South Africa
Women's rights